Nice is a census-designated place (CDP) in Lake County, California, United States. The population was 2,731 at the 2010 census, up from 2,509 at the 2000 census.

History
The town was originally called Clear Lake Villas, until Charles William Bayne renamed the place after his former hometown, Nice, France, around 1930. The Nice post office opened in 1930.

Geography

Demographics

2010
At the 2010 census Nice had a population of 2,731. The racial makeup of Nice was 2,187 (80.1%) White, 65 (2.4%) African American, 159 (5.8%) Native American, 42 (1.5%) Asian, 7 (0.3%) Pacific Islander, 123 (4.5%) from other races, and 148 (5.4%) from two or more races. Hispanic or Latino of any race were 384 people (14.1%).

The census reported that 2,719 people (99.6% of the population) lived in households, 6 (0.2%) lived in non-institutionalized group quarters, and 6 (0.2%) were institutionalized.

There were 1,234 households, 291 (23.6%) had children under the age of 18 living in them, 428 (34.7%) were opposite-sex married couples living together, 160 (13.0%) had a female householder with no husband present, 88 (7.1%) had a male householder with no wife present.  There were 147 (11.9%) unmarried opposite-sex partnerships, and 12 (1.0%) same-sex married couples or partnerships. 437 households (35.4%) were one person and 165 (13.4%) had someone living alone who was 65 or older. The average household size was 2.20.  There were 676 families (54.8% of households); the average family size was 2.79.

The age distribution was 505 people (18.5%) under the age of 18, 238 people (8.7%) aged 18 to 24, 549 people (20.1%) aged 25 to 44, 926 people (33.9%) aged 45 to 64, and 513 people (18.8%) who were 65 or older.  The median age was 46.6 years. For every 100 females, there were 99.2 males.  For every 100 females age 18 and over, there were 98.9 males.

There were 1,652 housing units at an average density of 956.3 per square mile, of the occupied units 711 (57.6%) were owner-occupied and 523 (42.4%) were rented. The homeowner vacancy rate was 2.7%; the rental vacancy rate was 7.6%.  1,489 people (54.5% of the population) lived in owner-occupied housing units and 1,230 people (45.0%) lived in rental housing units.

2000
At the 2000 census there were 2,509 people, 1,142 households, and 649 families in the CDP. The racial makeup of the CDP was 87.29% White, 2.15% African American, 4.90% Native American, 0.44% Asian, 0.24% Pacific Islander, 1.83% from other races, and 3.15% from two or more races. Hispanic or Latino of any race were 8.65%.

Of the 1,142 households 22.6% had children under the age of 18 living with them, 39.1% were married couples living together, 13.1% had a female householder with no husband present, and 43.1% were non-families. 35.6% of households were one person and 15.1% were one person aged 65 or older.  The average household size was 2.18 and the average family size was 2.79.

The age distribution was 23.1% under the age of 18, 5.9% from 18 to 24, 22.2% from 25 to 44, 27.1% from 45 to 64, and 21.7% 65 or older.  The median age was 44 years. For every 100 females, there were 97.7 males.  For every 100 females age 18 and over, there were 96.2 males.

The median household income was $24,340 and the median family income  was $28,358. Males had a median income of $29,444 versus $18,725 for females. The per capita income for the CDP was $13,173.  About 16.1% of families and 25.4% of the population were below the poverty line, including 43.3% of those under age 18 and 5.2% of those age 65 or over.

Government

References

External links

  Community profile

Census-designated places in Lake County, California
Census-designated places in California